Stephen Scrivens (born 11 March 1957) was an English professional football winger who played in the Football League for Fulham and Brentford.

Club career

Fulham 
Scrivens began his career as a trainee with Second Division club Fulham. Aged just 18, he made his senior debut during the 1974–75 season and signed his first professional contract in March 1975. He made three appearances and a goal during the 1975–76 season, but failed to make a further appearance before departing the club in June 1980.

Brentford (loan) 
Scrivens joined Fulham's West London rivals Brentford on loan in December 1976. Scrivens made five Fourth Division appearances during his spell and manager Bill Dodgin showed interest in signing him permanently, but a deal failed to materialise.

Non-league football 
After his release from Fulham in 1980, Scrivens signed for Isthmian League Premier Division strugglers Woking. He later played for Kingstonian, Staines Town and Dorking.

Career statistics

References

1957 births
People from Ewell
English footballers
Brentford F.C. players
English Football League players
Fulham F.C. players
Isthmian League players
Woking F.C. players
Association football forwards
Association football wingers
Kingstonian F.C. players
Staines Town F.C. players
Dorking F.C. players
Living people